William Anderson Pile (February 11, 1829July 7, 1889) was a nineteenth-century politician and minister from Missouri, as well as a general in the Union Army during the American Civil War. He was Governor of New Mexico Territory from 1869 to 1871. His father's name was Jacob Pile and his mother's name was Comfort Williams.

Biography

Born near Indianapolis, Indiana, Pile completed preparatory studies, studied theology, became a minister in the Methodist Episcopal Church and was a member of the Missouri conference. At the outbreak of the Civil War, he entered the Union Army as chaplain of the 1st Missouri Light Artillery Regiment in 1861, serving under Colonel Clinton B. Fisk. He was made captain, Battery I, 1st Missouri Light Artillery, March 1, 1862 and promoted to lieutenant colonel of the 33rd Missouri Volunteer Infantry September 5, 1862, and colonel December 23, 1862, brigadier general of volunteers in 1863, commanding Post of Port Hudson, District of Baton Rouge and Port Hudson, Department of the Gulf (December 26, 1864 - February 13, 1865; and commanding 1st Brigade, 1st Division, United States Colored Troops, District of West Florida, Department of the Gulf (February 19 - April 25, 1865, and brevet major general in 1865.

Three of the regiment's batteries were at Fort Donelson and apparently Pile was too. Made a battery commander, it is stated that he was at Shiloh; however, the records indicate that it was under the command of Lieutenant Charles H. Thurber. He was, however, in the Corinth, Mississippi operations which followed. As an infantry commander he fought at Devall's Bluff and took part in the Yazoo River expedition. Named a brigadier general, he took up recruiting duties in St. Louis and was not particularly concerned to whom-loyal or secessionist-the slaves he inducted belonged. After serving in a post command, he led a black brigade at Mobile. For the attack on Fort Blakely he was brevetted major general and was mustered out on August 24, 1865. His later career included one term as a radical Republican congressman; he was also territorial governor of New Mexico and a diplomat to Venezuela.

Pile was elected a Republican to the United States House of Representatives from Missouri in 1866, serving from 1867 to 1869, being unsuccessful for reelection in 1868. There, he served as chairman of the Committee on Expenditures in the Post Office Department from 1867 to 1869. Afterward, he was appointed Ambassador to Venezuela and Brazil by President Ulysses S. Grant in 1869, but his nomination was withdrawn and was instead appointed Territorial Governor of New Mexico which he served as from 1869 to 1871. Pile was again appointed Ambassador to Venezuela by President Grant in 1871, which he served as until 1874.

He moved to Monrovia, California in 1886, and purchased a 50-acre property, where he grew wine grapes. The following year, he commissioned the renowned Northern California architects Samuel and Joseph Cather Newsom to design a house for him, the stately "Idlewild" house at 255 N. Mayflower Avenue.  After serving for one year as mayor, he applied to be consul general in Melbourne, Australia, but contracted pneumonia that same year and died in Monrovia on July 7, 1889. He is buried, along with his son, William E. Pile, in Live Oak Cemetery, at 200 E. Duarte Road.

Gallery

See also

List of American Civil War generals (Union)

References

External links
 Retrieved on 2008-08-16

 http://newmexicohistory.org/people/william-a-pile
 http://bioguide.congress.gov/scripts/biodisplay.pl?index=p000350

1829 births
1889 deaths
19th-century American diplomats
19th-century American politicians
Methodists from New Mexico
California Republicans
Methodists from Indiana
19th-century American Methodist ministers
Methodists from California
Governors of New Mexico Territory
Methodists from Missouri
New Mexico Republicans
People from Monrovia, California
People of Missouri in the American Civil War
Politicians from Indianapolis
Republican Party members of the United States House of Representatives from Missouri
Union Army chaplains
Union Army generals
Mayors of places in California
19th-century American clergy